Eppes may refer to:

People 
 Francis W. Eppes (1801–1881), American planter, slave owner and civic leader
 John Wayles Eppes (1772–1823), American lawyer and politician
 Mary Jefferson Eppes (1778–1804), younger of Thomas Jefferson's two daughters who survived infancy
 Richard Eppes (1824–1896), American planter and surgeon
 T. J. Eppes, American cotton planter and politician

Fictional characters 
 Alan Eppes, a character on the television show Numb3rs, the father of Charlie and Don
 Charlie Eppes, a protagonist in the television program Numb3rs
 Don Eppes, a protagonist in the television show Numb3rs

Places 
 Eppes, Aisne, a commune in France
 Eppes Island, Virginia, United States
 Francis Eppes Plantation, Florida, United States